Ann Pellegrini is Professor of Performance Studies (Tisch School of the Arts) and Social and Cultural Analysis (Faculty of Arts and Science) at NYU and the director of NYU's Center for the Study of Gender and Sexuality. In 1998, she founded the Sexual Cultures book series at NYU Press with José Muñoz; she now co-edits the series with Joshua Takano Chambers-Letson and Tavia Nyong'o. Her book You Can Tell Just By Looking, co-authored with Michael Bronski and Michael Amico, was a finalist for the 2014 Lambda Literary Award for Best LGBT Non-Fiction.

Pellegrini has undergraduate degrees from Harvard College and Oxford University. She then earned an M.A. and Ph.D. from Harvard University.

Bibliography
 Performance Anxieties: Staging Psychoanalysis, Staging Race (Routledge, 1997)
 Love the Sin: Sexual Regulation and the Limits of Religious Tolerance with Janet R. Jakobsen (NYU Press, 2003; Beacon Press, 2004)
 "You Can Tell Just By Looking" and 20 Other Myths about LGBT Life and People with Michael Bronski and Michael Amico (Beacon Press, 2013)
 ed. Queer Theory and the Jewish Question with Daniel Boyarin and Danial Itzkovitz (Columbia University Press, 2003)
 ed. Secularisms with Janet R. Jakobsen (Duke University Press, 2008)

References

LGBT studies academics
Queer theorists
New York University people
Harvard University alumni
Alumni of the University of Oxford
Religion academics
Jewish philosophers
Jewish feminists
LGBT Jews
Living people
Year of birth missing (living people)